Ons Jabeur won the women's singles tennis title at the 2022 German Open after Belinda Bencic retired with an ankle injury from the final with the score at 6–3, 2–1.

Liudmila Samsonova was the defending champion, but lost in the second round to Veronika Kudermetova.

Seeds

Draw

Finals

Top half

Bottom half

Qualifying

Seeds

Qualifiers

Qualifying draw

First qualifier

Second qualifier

Third qualifier

Fourth qualifier

Fifth qualifier

Sixth qualifier

References

External sources 
Main draw
Qualifying draw

2022 WTA Tour
2022 WTA German Open - 1